There are over 20,000 Grade II* listed buildings in England. This page is a list of these buildings in the district of West Dorset in the county of Dorset.

Locations A–B

|}

Locations C–D

|}

Locations E–L

|}

Locations M–O

|}

Locations P–S

|}

Locations T–Y

|}

See also
Grade I listed buildings in Dorset

Notes

External links

West